F scale may refer to:

 F-scale (personality test), a personality test that attempts to quantify authoritarian tendencies
 Fujita scale, a system of rating of a tornado's intensity by its impact on structures and vegetation
 F scale (modelling), a 1:20.3 scaled gauge track used with model trains
 F Scale, a validity scale of the Minnesota Multiphasic Personality Inventory
 the F major  scale.

See also 
 F-number (disambiguation)
 F-ratio (disambiguation)